Amor Libre: 12 Grandes Exitos is a greatest hits album by Spanish singer-songwriter Camilo Sesto released in 1988. The album contains twelve songs from his career.

Tracking Listing 
All tracks by Camilo Sesto

 "Amor Libre" – 3:07
 "Jamas" – 3:22
 "Quieres Ser Mi Amante" – 4:07
 "La Culpa Ha Sido Mia" – 3:53
 "Fresa Salvaje" – 3:11
 "Mi Mundo Tu" (Sesto, Girón, Javier Losada, Pérez) –
 "Algo de Mi" – 3:27
 "Vivir Sin Ti" – 4:11
 "Vivir es Morir de Amor" – 3:53
 "Amor de Mujer" (Sesto, Sergio Fachelli) – 3:30
 "Quererte a Ti" – 4:01
 "Paloma Blanca, Paloma Mia" (Sesto, Fachelli) – 3:38

Personnel 

 Camilo Sesto – vocals

Chart performance

References 

Camilo Sesto compilation albums
1985 greatest hits albums